Rapaces de Gap is a French ice hockey team that is based in Gap and plays home games at the Patinoire Brown-Ferrand. The team played in the Ligue Magnus during the 2009–10 Ligue Magnus season. Gap won the French Championship three times in 1977, 1978 and 2015.

History

20th century
The team was founded in 1937 
The club Rapaces de Gap (Gapençais, Gap) was created in 1937; it entered championship of France in 1945 where it played in the second series. In 1955, the team inaugurated the Brown-Ferrand Ice Rink, which became artificial in 1961. The Gapençais started in the first series (elite division) for the 1962–1963 season. From 1962, the Canadian Camil Gélinas, who was coach of the team Athletic Club of Boulogne-Billancourt, became coach of Repaces de Gap at the request of the team's president in 1965. In 1972, work on the stadium, which included covering of the track, allowed the permanent use of the ice, and the hosting of the world championship group C.

The senior team was still progressing with Czech Zdeněk Bláha as a coach. The team under Bláha won their first Champion of France title in 1977. Gap also won the title the following year. The club continued thereafter to be a great training club, until the 1980s winning 21 titles of champion of France in the minor categories and being vice-champion of France in 1983–1984. In 1989, the club finished second-from-last in the National 1A but preferred demotion to end their expensive professional adventure.

For the 1992–1993 French Hockey Championship, Gap returned to the elite division for the first time, following a reshuffle of the divisions and the retirement from the national league at 10 clubs. In 1996, Gap won Division 1. New immediate descent, when Gap fails to stay in hen.

21st century
The club slowly descended the French hierarchy, having to play a dam to stay in Division 1 during the 2001–2002 season. The club recovered their form the next season, thanks to the expansion of the elite to a Super 16. This was a difficult task because with the lowest budget, Gap were often in the bottom of the table, returning to the second level in 2006. In 2009, thanks to a new title Division 1 champion, the club returned to the elite league.

Between the start of the 2009–2010 season and the end of the 2012–2013 season, Gap home games were broadcast live on the club's website. Long announced the renovation of the rink would run until August 2012. The rink was refurbished and its capacity was increased to 2,000 seats. During the 2011–2012 season, Gap played their home games at Palais Marseille Grand Est. On October 23, 2012, the club's president Georges Obninsky announced his resignation during a press conference. He was replaced by Philippe Vial and Jérôme Escallier. At the end of the 2016–2017 season, Rapaces de Gap won the Ligue Magnus, thus becoming Champions of France for the fourth time in their history. , the club has one of the best records in French hockey with 29 national titles, 37 podiums, 2 participations in the European Cup, 1 cup of As and 22 players selected in National Team including eight for Olympics.

Roster
Updated February 1, 2019.

Awards and trophies
 Coupe Magnus: 1977, 1978, 2015, 2017
 Division 1: 1996, 2006
 Coupe de la Ligue: 2016
 Coupe des As: 1986
 U22 : 5 championships
 U18 : 7 championships
 U16 : 7 championships
 U14 : 4 championships
 U11 : 3 championships
 Women's National Championship: 1 championship

Famous players
 Roland Cloutier
 Alain Daigle
 Larry Huras
 Christian Pouget
 Vadim Sharifijanov
 Pat Daley
 Rane Carnegie
 Ronan Quemener

NHL Players

References

External links
 Official website 

Ice hockey teams in France
Gap, Hautes-Alpes
Ice hockey clubs established in 1937
Sport in Hautes-Alpes
1937 establishments in France